UNR can mean:
 National University of Rwanda
 University of Nevada, Reno
 National University of Rosario, Argentina
 Ukrainian People's Republic, a Ukrainian nation-state established in 1917 and conquered by Bolsheviks in 1919
 Union for the New Republic, a defunct Gaullist French political party
 Ubuntu Netbook Remix, an official Ubuntu distribution for netbooks, which was renamed to Ubuntu Netbook Edition in April 2010